Eagle Peak is located in the Warner Mountains in Modoc County, California, United States. The area is protected in the South Warner Wilderness on the Modoc National Forest. The summit is the highest point in the Warner Mountains and Modoc County. Much of the precipitation that falls on Eagle Peak is snow due to the high elevation of the mountain.

See also 
 Mountain peaks of California
 Mountain peaks of North America
 Mountain peaks of the United States

References

External links 
 

Mountains of Modoc County, California
Mountains of Northern California